Wyatt Emory Cooper (September 1, 1927 – January 5, 1978) was an American author, screenwriter, and actor. He was the fourth husband of Vanderbilt family heiress and socialite Gloria Vanderbilt and the father of CNN anchor Anderson Cooper.

Life and career 
Cooper had his childhood in the small town of Pleasant Grove, Mississippi, outside of Quitman, Mississippi, the son of Rixie Jane Annie (née Anderson) and Emmet Debro Cooper. Cooper was from a poor family with deep Southern roots, and later moved to New Orleans, Louisiana, as a young child. He graduated from the University of California at Los Angeles (UCLA), where he majored in theater arts and began a career in acting.

In his twenties, Cooper moved to New York City to pursue acting. When Cooper was 26, he appeared on Broadway in the cast of The Strong Are Lonely, a drama that ran for a week at the Broadhurst Theatre in the fall of 1953. Cooper also wrote stories and plays.

In his thirties, Cooper lived in Los Angeles, attended both UCLA and UC Berkeley, and worked as a screenwriter.  While residing in West Hollywood, then an unincorporated area of Los Angeles County, Cooper lived near Dorothy Parker and her husband Alan Campbell. A close friendship developed, and a year after Parker's death in 1967, Cooper published an incisive and widely read profile in Esquire magazine, titled, "Whatever You Think Dorothy Parker Was Like, She Wasn't". Cooper moved to Manhattan in the early 1960s, and worked there as a magazine editor.

His writing includes the 1962 film The Chapman Report, the 1972 film The Glass House, and the 1975 book Families: A Memoir and a Celebration.

Personal life
On December 24, 1963, he married heiress Gloria Vanderbilt, becoming her fourth husband. The couple frequently appeared on the national "best-dressed" list. They had two sons: Carter Vanderbilt Cooper (1965–1988), who committed suicide, and Anderson Hays Cooper (b. 1967), who is an anchor for CNN.

Cooper wrote in his 1975 memoir, "It is in the family that we learn almost all we ever know of loving. In my sons' youth, their promise, their possibilities, my stake in immortality is invested." He died in Manhattan, New York City on January 5, 1978, at age 50, during open heart surgery, after having a heart attack the previous December.

References

Written works 
Families: A Memoir and a Celebration (Harper & Row, 1975)

External links 
  (as Wyatt Cooper)
  (as Wyatt Cooper)

20th-century American male actors
1927 births
1978 deaths
American male non-fiction writers
American male screenwriters
American male stage actors
20th-century American memoirists
Anderson Cooper
Male actors from Mississippi
People from Meridian, Mississippi
People from Panola County, Mississippi
People from Quitman, Mississippi
Screenwriters from Mississippi
Screenwriters from New York (state)
University of California, Berkeley alumni
University of California, Los Angeles alumni
Wyatt Emory Cooper
Writers from New Orleans
Writers from New York City
20th-century American male writers
20th-century American screenwriters
Burials at the Vanderbilt Family Cemetery and Mausoleum